Kykeon (from , ; "to stir, to mix") was an Ancient Greek drink of various descriptions. Some were made mainly of water, barley and naturally occurring substances. Others were made with wine and grated cheese. It is widely believed that kykeon usually refers to a psychoactive compounded brew, as in the case of the Eleusinian Mysteries. A kykeon was used at the climax of the Eleusinian Mysteries to break a sacred fast, but it is also mentioned as a favourite drink of Greek peasants.

Ancient sources and description
Kykeon is mentioned in Homeric texts: the Iliad describes it as consisting of Pramnian wine, barley, and grated goat's cheese. In the Odyssey, Circe adds some honey and pours her magic potion into it. In the Homeric Hymn to Demeter, the goddess refuses red wine but accepts kykeon made from water, barley, and pennyroyal.

It was supposed to have digestive properties: In Aristophanes' Peace Hermes recommends it to the hero who ate too much dry fruit and nuts.

Aristocrats shunned it as a peasant drink: Theophrastus' Characters depicts a peasant who goes to the Ecclesia drunk with kykeon.

Eleusinian Mysteries

In an attempt to solve the mystery of how so many people over the span of two millennia could have consistently experienced revelatory states during the culminating ceremony of the Eleusinian Mysteries, it has been posited that the barley used in the Eleusinian kykeon was parasitized by ergot, and that the psychoactive properties of that fungus triggered the intense experiences alluded to by the participants at Eleusis.

Discovery of fragments of ergot (fungi containing LSD-like psychedelic alkaloids) in a temple dedicated to the two Eleusinian goddesses excavated at the Mas Castellar site (Girona, Spain) provided some possible support for this theory. Ergot fragments were found inside a vase and within the dental calculus of a 25-year-old man, providing evidence of ergot being consumed. This finding seems to support the hypothesis of ergot as an ingredient of the Eleusinian kykeon.

For more on the possibilities of kykeon's psychoactive properties, see entheogenic theories of the Eleusinian mysteries.

See also
 Ancient Greece and wine
 Ancient Greek cuisine

References

Bibliography 
  — author A. Hofmann is the inventor of LSD

External links 
 

Entheogens
Ancient Greek religion
Herbal and fungal hallucinogens
Eleusinian Mysteries
Historical foods
Historical drinks
Ancient Greek cuisine